Thalleulia pondoana is a species of moth of the family Tortricidae. It is found in Tungurahua Province, Ecuador.

The wingspan is about 18 mm.  The ground colour of the forewings is yellowish brown sprinkled with brownish and densely strigulated (finely streaked) with greyish brown. The hindwings are pale brownish.

Etymology
The species name refers to Pondoa, the type locality.

References

Moths described in 2009
Euliini